Kilmarnock by-election may refer to one of three parliamentary by-elections held for the British House of Commons constituency of Kilmarnock, in Ayrshire, Scotland:

1929 Kilmarnock by-election
1933 Kilmarnock by-election
1946 Kilmarnock by-election

See also

Kilmarnock (UK Parliament constituency)